Stephen Charles Wood Ravenscroft (born  in Bradford) is an English former rugby union footballer who played at centre for Saracens and London Welsh. He won two England caps in 1998.

He is now a solicitor and plays occasional rugby for the SpoonAAs, formerly Anti-Assassins team, the rugby team of the Wooden Spoon charity.

External links 
 statistics from scrum.com

1970 births
Living people
English rugby union players
Rugby union centres
Rugby union players from Bradford
Saracens F.C. players
London Welsh RFC players
England international rugby union players